The Ten Small Mantras (Chinese: 十小咒; Pinyin: Shíxiǎozhòu) are a collection of esoteric Buddhist mantras or dharanis. They were complied by the monk Yulin (Chinese: 玉琳國師; Pinyin: Yùlín Guóshī), a teacher of the Qing dynasty Shunzhi Emperor (1638 – 1661), for monks, nuns, and laity to chant during morning liturgical services. They are still chanted in modern Chinese Buddhist ritual.

The Mantras

Cintamani Cakravartin Dhāraṇī 
Cintamani Cakravartin Dhāraṇī (Chinese: 如意寶輪王陀羅尼, Pinyin: Rúyìbǎolúnwáng Tuóluóní; associated with Cintamanicakra): 

Sanskrit: 

Namo ratna-trayāya nama āryā-valokite-śvarāya bodhi-sattvāya mahā-sattvāya mahā-karuṇikāya Tadyathā Oṃ cakra-varti cintāmaṇi mahā-padme ru ru tiṣṭhat jvala ākarṣāya hūṃ phat ̣svāhā

Traditional: 

南無佛馱耶。南無達摩耶。南無僧迦耶。南無觀自在菩薩摩訶薩。具大悲心者。怛侄他。唵。斫羯囉伐底。震多末尼。摩訶。缽蹬謎。嚕嚕嚕嚕。底瑟吒。爍囉阿羯利。沙夜吽。癹莎訶。唵。缽蹋摩。震多末尼。爍囉吽。唵跋喇陀。缽亶謎吽。

Pinyin: 

Námó fótuó yé. Námó dámó yé. Námó sēngjiā yé. Námó guānzìzài púsà móhēsà. Jùdà bēixīnzhě. Dázhítā. Ǎn. Zhuójié luōfádǐ. Zhènduō mòní. Móhē. Bōdēn mí. Lǔ lǔ lǔ lǔ. Dǐsèzhā. Shuòluō ājiélì. Shāyèhōng. Báshāhē. Ǎn. Bōtàmó. Zhènduō mòní. Shuòluōhōng. Ǎn bálǎtuó. Bōdǎn míhōng.

English: 

Adoration to the three gems. Adoration to the noble (ārya) Lord (īśvarā) who gazes down (avalokite) the world (loka), the enlightened sentient being, the great sentient being, the great compassionate one! Like this: Oṃ! Turn the wheel, the wish-fulfilling jewel, the great lotus, (quick, quick), Flame stays firm! Calling for the holy mind to destroy obstacles, So be it!

The Mantra for Dispersing Calamities and Bringing Auspicious Good Will 
Jvala Mahaugra Dhāraṇī (Chinese: 消災吉祥神咒, Pinyin: Xiāozāi Jíxiáng Shénzhòu): 

Sanskrit: 

NAMAḤ SAMANTHA BUDDHĀNĀṂ APRATIHATĀ ŚĀSANANĀṂ TADYATHĀ: OṂ KHA KHA, KHĀHI KHĀHI, HŪṂ HŪṂ JVĀLĀ-JVĀLĀ, PRAJVALA-PRAJVALA; TIṢṬHA-TIṢṬHA ṢṬIRI-ṢṬIRI SPHOṬA-SHPOṬA ŚĀNTIKA ŚRIYE SVĀHĀ

Traditional: 

曩謨三滿哆。母馱喃。阿缽囉底。賀多舍。娑曩喃。怛侄他。唵。佉佉。佉呬。佉呬。吽吽。入縛囉。入縛囉。缽囉入縛囉。缽囉入縛囉。底瑟奼。底瑟奼。瑟致哩。瑟致哩。娑癹吒。娑癹吒。扇底迦。室哩曳。娑縛訶。

Pinyin: 

Nǎngmó sānmǎnduō. Mǔtuónán. Ābōluōdǐ. Hèduōshě. Suōnǎngnán. Dázhítā. Ǎn. Qū qū. Qū xì. Qū xì. Hōng hōng. Rùfùluō. Rùfùluō. Bōluō rùfùluō. Bōluō rùfùluō. Dǐsèchà. Dǐsèchà. Sèzhìlī. Sèzhìlī. Suōbázhā. Suōbázhā. Shàndǐ jiā. Shìlīyè. Suōfùhē.

English: 

Adoration to the universal Buddhas (and their) unimpeded religions (śāsana)! Thus: om! in the sky (ākāśa 虛空中), in emptiness, destroy, destroy (all obstacles), the holy mind! the holy mind! Flame, light, brilliant light, brilliant light, stay, stay. Shatter, shatter, burst, burst, disperses calamities (and brings) fortune/opulence (śrī) So be it!

Guna Ratna Sila Dhāraṇī 
Guna Ratna Sila Dhāraṇī (Root of Jeweled Ethics Dharani), Chinese: 功德寶山神咒, Pinyin: Gōngdé Bǎoshān Shénzhòu (The Meritorious Precious Mountain Dhāraṇī):   

Sanskrit:

Namo buddhāya namo dharmāya namaḥ saṃghāya (om ̣) siddhe huru huru sidhuru kṛpā kṛpā siddhāṇi puruṇi svāhā

Traditional: 

南無佛馱耶。南無達摩耶。南無僧伽耶。唵。悉帝護嚕嚕。悉都嚕。只利波。吉利婆。悉達哩。布嚕哩。娑縛訶。

Pinyin: 

Námó fótuó yé. Námó dámó yé. Námó sēngjiā yé. Ǎn. Xīdì hùlǔlǔ. Xīdōulǔ. Zhǐlìbō. Jílìpó. Xīdálī. Bùlǔlī. Suōfùhē.

English: 

Adoration to the Buddha! adoration to the Buddhist teaching! adoration to the Buddhist community! Accomplished one, quick, quick, accomplishes quick, be merciful, be compassionate, accomplishes perfectly. So be it!

Mahācundi Dhāraṇī 
Mahācundi Dhāraṇī (Chinese: 準提神咒, Pinyin: Zhǔntí Shénzhòu; associated with Cundi):  

Sanskrit:

Namaḥ saptānām samyak-saṃbuddha koṭinām. Tadyathā: Oṃ cale cule Cunde svāhā.

Traditional:

南無颯哆喃。三藐三菩陀。俱胝喃。怛侄他。唵。折戾主戾。準提娑婆訶。

Pinyin:

Námó sàduōnán. Sānmiǎo sānpútuó. Jùzhīnán. Dázhítā. Ǎn. Zhélì zhǔlì. Zhǔntí suōpóhē.

English:

Adoration to 'seven billions perfect status, perfect enlightened beings', like this: om cha'le chu'le Chundi (the Extreme purity), All hail!

Dhāraṇī of the Holy Tathāgata of Immeasurable Lifespan, King of Determined Radiance 
Aparimitāyur-jñāna-suviniścita-tejo-rājāya Dhāraṇī (Chinese: 大乘無量壽決定光明王陀羅尼, Pinyin: Dàchéng Wúliàngshòu Juédìng Guāngmíngwáng Tuóluóní; associated with Amitabha):  

Sanskrit:

Namaḥ saptānām samyak-saṃbuddha koṭinām. Tadyathā: Oṃ cale cule Cunde svāhā.

Traditional:

唵。捺摩巴葛瓦帝。阿巴囉密沓。阿優哩阿納。蘇必你。實執沓。牒左囉宰也。怛塔哿達也。阿囉訶帝。三藥三不達也。怛你也塔。唵。薩哩巴。桑斯葛哩。叭哩述沓。達囉馬帝。哿哿捺。桑馬兀哿帝。莎巴瓦比述帝。馬喝捺也。叭哩瓦哩娑訶。

Pinyin:

Ǎn. Nàmó bāgéwǎdì. Ābāluōmìdá. Āyōulī ānà. Sūbìnǐ. Shízhídá. Diézuǒ luōzǎi yě. Dátǎgědá yě. Āluōhēdì. Sānyào sānbùdá yě. Dánǐyětǎ. Ǎn. Sàlībā. Sāngsīgélī. Bālīshùdá. Dáluōmǎdì. Gěgěnà. Sāngmǎwù gědì. Shābāwǎ bǐshùdì. Mǎhē nàyě. Bālīwǎlī suōhē.

English:

Adoration to the Honourable, Highest(pari)-Infinite(amita)-life(ayus)- insight(jnna) -decisive-light(tejo)-king(raja), Exalted-one (Tathagata, thus come), perfect disciple (Arahat), completely, perfectly enlightened one (Samyak-sambuddha). Like this: Om! all (sarva) righteous behaviour are in highest purity, reality of phenomena enters into emptiness, intrinsic nature are completely purified. Family of Great School have auspiciously completed.

Bhaiṣajyaguru Vaiḍūrya Prabhasa Tathāgatā Abhisecani Dhāraṇī 
Bhaiṣajyaguru Vaiḍūrya Prabhasa Tathāgatā Abhisecani Dhāraṇī (Chinese: 藥師灌頂真言, Pinyin: Yàoshī Guàndǐng Zhēnyán; associated with Bhaiṣajyaguru):  

Sanskrit:

Namo Bhagavate Bhaiṣajya-guru-vaiḍūrya-prabha-rājāya Tathāgatāya Arhate Samyak-saṃbuddhāya. Tadyathā:

OṂ BHAIṢAJYE, BHAIṢAJYE, BHAIṢAJYA-SAMUD-GATE SVĀHĀ

Traditional:

南謨薄伽伐帝。鞞殺社。窶嚕薛琉璃。缽喇婆。喝囉阇也。怛他揭多也。阿囉喝帝。三藐三勃陀耶。怛侄他。唵。鞞殺逝。鞞殺逝。鞞殺社。三沒揭帝莎訶。

Pinyin:

Nánmó báojiāfádì. Bǐngshāshè. Jùlǔ xuēliúlí. Bōlǎpó. Hēluōdū yě. Dátājiēduō yě. Āluōhēdì. Sānmiǎo sānbótuó yé. Dázhítā. Ǎn. Bǐngshāshì. Bǐngshāshì. Bǐngshāshè. Sānméi jiēdì shāhē.

English:

Give Praise to Honorable Medicine-teacher lipis-light-king, the Exalted One, The perfected disciple, Perfectly Self-Awakened One! Like this: "Auspicious one! on medicine, on medicine, the medicine appears, so be it!"

Āryavalokiteśvarā Bodhisattva Vikurvana Dhāraṇī 
Āryavalokiteśvarā Bodhisattva Vikurvana Dhāraṇī (Chinese: 觀音靈感真言, Pinyin: Guānyīn Línggǎn Zhēnyán; The True Words to Bring a Response From Guanyin):  

Sanskrit:

Oṃ maṇi padme hūṃ mahā niryāṇa cittot-pāda citta-kṣana vitarka sarvārtha bhūri siddha kāma pūrṇa bhūri dyotot-panna Namaḥ lokeśvarāya svāhā

Traditional:

唵。嘛呢叭彌吽。麻曷倪牙納。積都特巴達。積特些納。微達哩葛。薩而斡而塔。卜哩悉塔葛。納補囉納。納卜哩。丟忒班納。捺麻嚧吉。說囉耶莎訶。

Pinyin:

Ǎn. Maní bāmí hōng. Máhé níyánà. Jīdōutè bādá. Jītè xiēnà. Wēidálīgé. Sàérwòértǎ. Bolī xītǎgé. Nà bǔluōnà. Nàbolī. Diūtè bānnà. Nàmá lújí. Shuōluōyé shāhē.

English:

Oṃ maṇi padme hūṃ. Determined to leave greatly (the passions and delusions). Constant thought of reflection. All truths are greatly accomplished (siddha) with full (pūrṇa) satisfaction (kāmam). Manifestation (utpannā) of great (bhūri) luminosity (dyota). Adoration to the Lord (iśvarā) of the world. All hail!

The Blame Dispersing Words of the Seven Buddhas 
Sapta Atitabuddha Karasaniya Dhāraṇī (Chinese: 七佛滅罪真言, Pinyin: Qīfó Mièzuì Zhēnyán; associated with The Seven Buddhas of Antiquity):  

Sanskrit:

Deva devate, cyu ha cyu hate, dhara dhṛte, nir-hṛte, vimlate svāhā.

Traditional:

離婆離婆帝。求訶求訶帝。陀羅尼帝。尼訶囉帝。毗黎你帝。摩訶伽帝。真陵幹帝。莎婆訶。

Pinyin:

Lípó lípó dì. Qiúhē qiúhē dì. Tuóluóní dì. Níhēluō dì. Pílínǐ dì. Móhē jiādì. Zhēnlínggàn dì. Shāpóhē.

English:

Calling, calling out! Revealing, Revealing all! Making heartfelt prayers! Dissolving, disappearing blame! Vanishing vanished blame! Eminent virtues appear, and all blame is truly buried and gone by this power, svaha!

Sukhāvatī-vyūha Dhāraṇī 
Sukhāvatī-vyūha Dhāraṇī (Chinese: 往生淨土神咒, Pinyin: Wǎngshēng Jìngtǔ Shénzhòu; associated with Amitabha and his Pure Land of Sukhāvatī):  

Sanskrit:

Namo Amitābhāya Tathāgatāya. Tadyathā: Om amṛtod bhave, amṛta siddhaṃ bhave, amṛta vi-krānte, amṛta vi-krānta gāmine, gagana kīrti-karī svāhā.

Traditional:

南無阿彌多婆夜。哆他伽多夜。哆地夜他。阿彌利。都婆毗。阿彌唎哆。悉耽婆毗。阿彌唎多。毗迦蘭帝。阿彌唎哆。毗迦蘭多。伽彌膩。伽伽那。枳多迦利。娑婆訶。

Pinyin:

Námó ēmíduōpó yè. Duōtājiāduō yè. Duōdeyètā. Ēmílì. Dōupópí. Ēmílìduō. Xīdān pópí. Ēmílìduō. Píjiālándì. Ēmílìduō. Píjiālánduō. Jiāmínì. Jiājiānà. Zhǐduō jiālì. Suōpóhē.

English:

Adoration to the Perfect One of Infinite Light, namely: Nectar-producing one! Nectar-creation-perfecting one! Nectar-miracle one! (One) performs miracle with nectar, he makes (nectar) to pervade as widely as sky, All Hail!

Sridevi Dhāraṇī 
Sridevi Dhāraṇī (Chinese: 大吉祥天女咒, Pinyin: Dà Jíxiáng Tiānnǚ Zhòu; associated with Lakshmi):  

Sanskrit:

Namo buddhāya, namo dharmāya, namaḥ saṃghāya, namo śri-mahā-devīya.

Tadyathā: Oṃ pari-pūrṇa care, samanta darśane, mahā vihāra gate, samanta vidhā mane

mahā kārya pratis ̣t ̣hāne, sarvārtha sādhane suprati-pūri, āyāna dharmatā mahā avikopite

mahā maitrī upa-saṃhite, mahā-kleśe su-saṃgṛhīte, samantārtha anu-pālane svāhā.

Traditional:

南無佛陀。南無達摩。南無僧伽。南無室利。摩訶提鼻耶。怛你也他。波利富樓那。遮利三曼陀。達舍尼。摩訶毗訶羅伽帝。三曼陀。毘尼伽帝。摩訶迦利野。波祢。波囉。波祢。薩利縛栗他。三曼陀。修缽黎帝。富隸那。阿利那。達摩帝。摩訶毗鼓畢帝。摩訶彌勒帝。婁簸僧只帝。醯帝簁。僧只醯帝。三曼陀。阿他阿 [少/免] 。婆羅尼。娑婆訶

Pinyin:

Námó fótuó. Námó dámó. Námó sēngjiā. Námó shìlì. Móhē tíbí yé. Dánǐyětā. Bōlì fùlóunà. Zhēlì sānmàntuó. Dáshění. Móhē píhēluó jiādì. Sānmàntuó. Píní jiādì. Móhē jiālì yě. Bō mí. Bō luō. Bō mí. Sàlì fùlìtā. Sānmàntuó. Xiūbōlí dì. Fùlìnà. Ālìnà. Dámódì. Móhē pígǔbì dì. Móhē mílè dì. Lóubǒ sēngzhǐ dì. Xīdìshāi. Sēngzhǐ xīdì. Sānmàntuó. Ā tā ā [shǎo/miǎn]. Póluóní. Suōpóhē.

English:

Adoration to the Buddha, adoration to the Buddhist teaching, adoration to the Buddhist community, adoration to the great auspicious goddess! Like this: Oṃ (She) completes (pūrṇa) the deed (ka're, kama) successively (pari), all good to be seen, abides in great position, understands (mana) all good knowledge stays peaceably in great practice (caryā), in procuring (sādhane) all truths perfectly, and approaching great indestructible nature benefits (all) with great compassion, manages the great defilements, supports the welfare (of all), All Hail!

References

Buddhist mantras